The climate of Houston is classified as a humid subtropical climate, with tropical influences.

The normal annual precipitation measures . Rainfall is ample throughout the year, though dry spells do occur. Severe weather of Houston mostly takes the form of flooding, which occurs most commonly in the months of May to October, which is the city's monsoon season. Supercell thunderstorms sometimes bring tornadoes to the area, most commonly during spring.  Houston sometimes experiences tropical cyclones during the Atlantic hurricane season, which can bring heavy rain and significant damage to the city. The last hurricane to hit was Hurricane Nicholas in 2021.

Seasonal observation

Temperature-wise the city (and much of Southeast Texas) has four distinct seasons (Summer, Spring, Fall, Winter), but weather wise the city has only two seasons (rainy and dry). The wet season lasts from April/May to September/October, the dry season lasts from November/December to March/April. However during El Nino or La Nina years the wet and dry season can often either last longer than usual or be delayed.

Summer

June through August in Houston is very hot and humid, often with scattered afternoon showers and thunderstorms. The average relative humidity ranges from over 90 percent in the morning to around 60 percent in the afternoon. Summer temperatures in Houston are very similar to average temperatures seen in tropical climates, such as in the Philippines and the lower elevations of Central America. The value of relative humidity results in a heat index higher than the actual temperature. On June 29, 2013, the temperature at George Bush Intercontinental Airport reached , the highest ever recorded in June. Heat stroke can strike people who stay outdoors for long periods of time during the summer, making hydration essential for outdoor work and recreational activity. The 2014 summer season did not yield 100+ degree weather in response to the monsoon-esque rainfall during late June to August, during a period where the Pacific Coast off Central America was heating up, which evolved into the 2014–16 El Nino event - this cycle was also observed between 1971–76, during post-El Nino intervals.

  Because of the high temperatures that persist in the months of April through October, most indoor workers in Houston spend the hottest part of the day in an air-conditioned environment. After World War II, air conditioning stimulated the growth of Houston, and was called the most air-conditioned city in the world in 1950.

Autumn
Autumn in Houston is warm, with temperatures averaging in the upper 60s to lower 80s °F (20-28 °C) during the day and in the 40s to lower 60s °F (10-17 °C) at night. Cool fronts that move through the region during the fall can bring rain. Hurricanes can move into the area from the Gulf of Mexico, bringing heavy rains and high winds. However, most years see little or no significant hurricane activity. Flooding most frequently occurs in October and November, which is the end of the Southeast Texas wet season. Most of these flood events result from remnants of Eastern Pacific cyclones interacting with upper-level boundaries; October 2015 was the latest example of such an occurrence, wherein the remnants of Hurricane Patricia brought over 9 inches of rain to the city. The latest hurricane to reach Texas was Hurricane Harvey in August 2017.

Winter
Winters in Houston are relatively mild, dry, and temperate compared to most areas of the United States. Houston winters are, on average, colder than South Florida and Southern California, on par with southern Louisiana and Central Florida, but slightly warmer than Dallas, Atlanta, San Antonio, Austin, and other inland southern cities. George Bush Intercontinental Airport sees an average of 9.6 days per year of freezing temperatures. Cold fronts during the winter can bring nighttime lows that drop into the 30s but usually remain above freezing. The coldest weather of the season often includes temperatures in the low 30s to mid-40s at night. Hard freezes are not uncommon in North Houston; George Bush Intercontinental Airport has recorded at least one freeze every winter since it opened in 1969. However, areas in the central or southern parts of the Houston metro area are consistently several degrees warmer on the coldest winter nights. Areas south of Interstate 10 can have entire winters without a freeze.

In December, southward-moving cold fronts  can bring cold rain, low wind chills, and, rarely, frozen precipitation. Early January is the coldest time of the year, with temperatures moderating slightly by February. Winter is also the driest part of the year for Houston.

Spring
Spring comes with a gradual warm up from winter, lasting from February through May. Spring thunderstorms are common, often with spectacular lightning shows. This rainfall prompts Houston's 10-month-long "growing season" to begin. March sees the return of many types of insects, including butterflies and mosquitoes, to Houston's warm climate.

Precipitation
Rainfall is the most common form of precipitation in Houston and is plentiful throughout the year. The city (and much of South and Southeast Texas) has its own irregular monsoon season, which usually lasts from May to October, but sometimes April to September. Houston normally receives  of precipitation on 104.0 days annually. Total rainfall in 2017, the year of Hurricane Harvey at IAH in northern Houston, was 79.69; rainfall the month of the storm, August 2017, at IAH totaled 39.11.

In 2011, a drought resulted in a total of 24.57 inches with less than 1 inch recorded at IAH in six of the year's 12 months; only 0.09 inch was recorded that August and 0.11 inch that April.

Flash flood warnings are common all year, and due to the flat landscape, heavy rains often threaten life and property in the city. Sea breeze showers which are monsoon-like (especially during the summer months, originating from the mesoscale convective cycle, where the polar jet stream usually forms an omega block) are common throughout the Texas Gulf Coast area (from Brownsville to the Florida Peninsula), which has a similar climate to areas like Mumbai and Kolkata – locals refer to the sea breeze showers as the Gulf Coast Monsoon (also called the Gulf of Mexico or the Texas Monsoon), despite Houston being 50 feet above sea level. The sea breeze showers are also a contributor to the North American Monsoon.

Sleet and freezing rain are more common than snow in the Houston area. While accumulating snow events are rare in Houston, brief snow flurries occur every winter in the greater Houston area. These usually have no impacts on travel as they are light, brief and isolated. Hail can accumulate but only in small quantities.

Extreme weather
Houston has occasional severe weather, mostly flooding. Hurricanes that have the potential to landfall bring severe damage to the area. Seven major hurricanes have hit the Galveston and Houston areas in the past 100 years. Four have done significant damage to Houston.

Hurricanes and tropical storms
Because Houston is on the Gulf of Mexico, the city has a high chance of being hit by hurricanes or tropical storms every hurricane season (June through November).

In 1837, the Racer's Storm passed just to the south of the town, raising water levels four feet. That hurricane weakened to a tropical storm by the time it reached Houston. The periphery of Hurricane Carla hit the city in 1961, causing major damage to Houston. At the time of landfall, Carla was the most powerful tropical system to hit the Texas coast in over 40 years. In 1983, the city was struck squarely by Hurricane Alicia, causing $1 billion of damage to the city during a down period in the city's economy.

Area flooding was catastrophic and widespread. The storm completely overwhelmed the flood control system and caused 22 deaths in Houston and $6.05 billion (2006 USD) in damage. It was the only tropical storm in history to have its name retired until Tropical Storm Erika in Dominica in 2015.

Tropical Storm Erin made landfall in August 2007 with heavy rainfall. Metropolitan Transit Authority of Harris County, Texas, halted its light rail and bus services in view of the effects. Four deaths in the city were attributed to the storm. The Houston Fire Department reported 72 rescue operations.

Hurricane Ike made landfall near Galveston, Texas in September 2008. Although only a Category 2 storm (out of 5), Ike brought moderate rain but high winds for an unusually long duration (upwards of nine hours). The roof of Reliant Stadium (home of the Houston Texans NFL team) was damaged and windows were blown out of several high-rise buildings in downtown Houston. Storm surge affected areas around Galveston Bay, stripping some coastal islands of homes. Devastated Galveston Island much resembled a war zone.  Authorities prohibited non-emergency access to the island for many weeks. Hurricane Ike left ninety percent of people in the Houston Area without power. Never before had the city experienced such widespread or long-term power outage: no air conditioning, no refrigeration, no lights, and no phones. Day-to-day business slowed immensely. Area grocery stores were stripped bare and sold water and ice for cash by flashlight. Trucks from around the country brought in emergency supplies, especially water and ice. Most of the city was without power for 2–3 days — some for 2 to 3 weeks.

Hurricane Harvey made landfall in Rockport, Texas, very early on August 26, 2017. By August 30, Houston was flooded, due to torrential rainfall from the hurricane.

Flooding
Flooding is a recurring problem in Houston, this is on par with the fact that the city is on a flood plain and has a rainy season. It is especially severe in low-lying areas on the far east end of town along the San Jacinto River. The flat wetlands and paved-over coastal prairie around Houston drain slowly and easily flood. The area is drained by a network of bayous (small, slow-moving rivers, often dredged and enlarged to increase volume) and man-made drainage ditches, which are usually dry most of the year. In fall, cold fronts bring in rainstorms and flooding is not uncommon. This might flood certain low-lying intersections, but doesn't generally affect citizens or the business of the city. However, occasionally very heavy thunderstorms dump so much water on the city that widespread congestion and even property damage in low-lying areas result. Tropical Storm Allison in 2001 was so severe that many parts of town that had never flooded before were flooded seriously. Another storm happened in June 2015 (Tropical Storm Bill) that had a similar impact on Houston, causing several highways to be closed due to the bayou overflowing; this event followed flooding from May 24–26. Another similar storm in April 2016 resulted in widespread, severe flooding across Houston and surrounding suburbs in an event later known as the "Tax Day Floods". In late August 2017, Hurricane Harvey flooded Houston, causing severe widespread damage and at least 14 deaths. On the night of May 18, 2021, a large and intense severe storm impacted Houston. It caused up to 4 inches of rain per hour in some areas. The storm could've done more because was moving faster than they thought.

Tornadoes
Unlike Dallas, Houston is not in Tornado Alley; however, smaller tornadoes can occur during severe weather. They are most likely to be found along frontal boundaries of an air mass during the spring months. Tornadoes in Houston usually measure a weak EF1 on the Enhanced Fujita scale and cause light to moderate damage to well-constructed buildings. The strongest recorded tornado in Houston history was an F4 on November 21, 1992, part of a large outbreak of tornadoes in Harris County.

Winter storms

Snow falls infrequently in the Magnolia City. When it does occur, it usually melts immediately on the ground with light accumulation on roofs and raised surfaces. Only very uncommonly does it accumulate on the ground. Since 1895, it has snowed 39 times in Houston at an average of about once every 3 years, though some decades have several instances of recorded snowfall while others have only one each (e.g., the 1930s and 1950s) and one decade where there wasn't any snowfall (1990s). The last recorded snowfall in Houston was on February 15, 2021. There were more incidences of snow in the 1980s on average than any other decade recorded, but the 2000s also witnessed more frequent and record-breaking snows.

 February 14–February 15, 1895:  of snow, its largest snowfall from one storm on record.
 February 12, 1960:  of snow.
 January 11, 1973:  of snow.
 December 10, 2008: Tied the earliest accumulating snowfall record.
 December 4, 2009: Broke the earliest accumulating snowfall record.
 December 7, 2017: 0.7 inches (2 cm) of snow.
 November 13, 2018 Broke Earliest Snowfall Record 
February 15, 2021

The 2004 Christmas Eve snowstorm brought a never-before-seen white Christmas to the region. In descending order of frequency, the most snow has fallen in January, followed by February, December, November, and finally a single occurrence on March 10, 1932, which was also the lowest recorded temperature for that month, .

Occurrences of freezing rain, also known as ice storms, are more common than snow in Houston. Some of the most recent ice storms occurred in 1997, 2007, February 4, 2011, and January 16, 2018. An overnight event occurred from January 23, 2014 to January 24, another significant icing occurred a few days later on January 28, and a third event took place on March 4. These storms can be very disruptive since road crews are not equipped to handle such rare events over the city's expansive size. When ice occurs, roads and schools are usually closed. The city's Office of Emergency Management encourages driver's to "avoid driving unless absolutely necessary... if roadways are at risk of icing." Typically, such ice storms affect mainly the northern/western areas of the metro, while the southern/eastern areas are left with just cold rain. The ice storm that occurred on January 16, 2018 started as cold rain for several hours, before changing to a wintry mix and then eventually sleet and snow. Temperatures started in the low-mid 30s and quickly dropped to the 20s in the afternoon, and before dipping into the teens by the evening/overnight hours, which caused all the rain to turn to ice, accumulating a thickness up to 1" on some roads, bridges, overpasses, making it one of the worst winter storms in the history of the state. The Winter Storm of Feb 15th 2021 was a very Dangerous & Devastating one for the Houston Area, starting out mainly as Freezing Rain with a few flakes or sleet pellets mixing in at times, then transitioning into moderate/heavy sleet during the evening and finally changing over to snow overnight bringing anywhere between 1-4" inches of snow throughout the Houston area on top of a layer of ice/sleet, there were widespread power outages throughout the majority of the state including Houston/Harris County.

El Niño
During El Niño events, Houston winters are cooler and wetter than normal due to a stronger southern jet stream, which can increase the length of the normal wet season in Houston. Increased clouds during El-Niño winters are what keep the temperatures from warming up. During La Niña events, the jet stream shifts further north, resulting in a warmer and drier winter. The chance of damage from tropical storms and hurricanes also goes up during La Niña events, due to decreased Atlantic wind shear. Post-El Niño weather during the spring usually result in increased rainfall, as demonstrated during the Memorial Day 2015 and Tax Day/Memorial Day/early June 2016 flood events, where the Houston Metro area (and the rest of the state) experienced a climate similar to the South Asian summer monsoon (in this case, a stalled low-pressure system—usually from an upper-level low from the northeast Pacific Ocean, migrates east, where the northern polar jet stream form the usual omega blocks—originates over the Four Corners region or the Sierra Madre Occidental/Sierra Madre Oriental mountain ranges in northern Mexico).

Environmental issues

Houston has had a troubled past with pollution of many types. This is due to the fact that Houston has been the home for the oil and gas industry since its inception in the early 1900s, when there was little environmental regulation. Harris County, where the bulk of the city has been historically located, is home to 15 Environmental Protection Agency Superfund sites, more than any other area in Texas. The list contains numerous companies, streets and waterways that have been considered hazardous to humans in various ways.

Houston's environmental problems stem from a long history of pollution. Houston may be considered the air-conditioning capital of the world due to its hot and humid metropolitan. Since the 1930s, air-conditioning was built into all commercial buildings like theaters, malls, and corporations. Even the Astrodome was air-conditioned, making baseball players and fans comfortable for decades. This led to the possibility of an energy crisis, because of the popularity of air-conditioning in Houston, energy costs are generally higher than normal.

Air pollution
Houston is well known for its oil and petrochemical industries, which are leading contributors to the city's economy. The industries located along the ship channel, coupled with a growing population, have caused a considerable increase in air pollution for the city each year. Houston has excessive ozone levels and is ranked among the most ozone-polluted cities in the United States. Ground-level ozone, or smog, is Houston's predominant air pollution problem. In 2011, Houston was ranked as the 17th most polluted city in the US, according to the American Lung Association. A 2007 assessment found the following twelve air pollutants to be definite risks to health in Houston:
ozone - respiratory and cardiovascular effects
particulates less than 2.5 μm in diameter (PM2.5) - respiratory and cardiopulmonary effects
diesel particulate matter (DPM) - cancer
1,3-butadiene - cancer and reproductive effects
hexavalent chromium - cancer
benzene - cancer
ethylene dibromide - cancer
acrylonitrile - cancer
formaldehyde - cancer and respiratory effects
acrolein - respiratory effects
chlorine - respiratory effects
hexamethylene diisocyanate - pulmonary and respiratory effects

The State of Texas concluded that, since 2000, the Manchester neighborhood in eastern Houston had the highest annual averages of 1,3-butadiene of any area in Texas. Houston's air quality has often been compared to Los Angeles and Beijing.

Houston has introduced many programs since the 2000 federal order to reduce air pollution in the city. The most notable project was the METRORail light rail system constructed in 2004. The light rail system was designed to encourage Houstonians to utilize public transportation instead of their automobiles.

Pollution rankings from the EPA and ALA are administered in terms of peak-based standards, focusing strictly on the worst days of the year; on average, ozone levels in Houston are lower than those seen in many other cities of the country, due to dominant winds off the Gulf that ensure clean, marine air.

Water pollution
Houston has also seen recent improvements to the city's waterways. The banks of Buffalo Bayou have been cleaned of garbage and have been turned into jogging trails and parks. Since the mid-1990s, Houston has seen a great increase in wildlife along the bayou due to many successful cleaning attempts. The Port of Houston has not seen any major cleaning attempts.

Notes

References

External links
Weather Averages for Houston
Comparison with month average and actual temps

Houston
Climate of Texas
Houston